Paul Réneau (born 28 September 1960) is a Belizean former athlete. He competed as a sprinter at the 1984 Summer Olympics and as a cyclist at the 1988 Summer Olympics.

References

1960 births
Living people
Belizean male sprinters
Belizean male cyclists
Olympic athletes of Belize
Olympic cyclists of Belize
Athletes (track and field) at the 1984 Summer Olympics
Cyclists at the 1988 Summer Olympics
Place of birth missing (living people)